Kiss My Art is the second studio album released by Australian rock band, Painters and Dockers, which peaked in the top 30 of the Australian Recording Industry Association (ARIA) albums charts in September 1988. The album spawned four singles, "Nude School", "Die Yuppie Die", "Love on Your Breath" and "Safe Sex", and the first two achieved top 50 chart success. The album was produced by hard rocker, Lobby Loyde, except for "Nude School" which was produced by Francois Taviaux aka Franswah.

Background
Painters and Dockers formed in 1982 with Vladimir Juric (guitars, backing vocals), Andy Marron (drums), Phil Nelson (bass guitar), Chris O'Connor (guitars, backing vocals) and Paul Stewart (vocals, trumpet). Their name was chosen when they played at a pub frequented by Federated Ship Painters and Dockers Union members, with no other name they adopted Painters and Dockers for the gig and kept it. By 1984, Marron had left and new members were Colin Buckler (drums), Mick Morris (saxophone) and Dave Pace (trumpet, backing vocals). "Nude School" was released in June 1987 and peaked in the top 30 of the Australian Recording Industry Association (ARIA) singles charts and was followed by "Die Yuppie Die" which reached the top 50 in September. Their third studio album, Kiss My Art, was released in August 1988 on Mushroom Records' imprint White Label Records, which peaked in the top 30 of the ARIA albums charts in September. The album was produced by hard rocker, Lobby Loyde, except for the earlier track, "Nude School" which was produced by Francois Taviaux aka Franswah. Two further singles, "Love on Your Breath" and "Safe Sex", from the album were released but did not reach the top 50.

Track listing

Personnel

Musicians
 Colin Buckler – drums
 Vladimir Juric – guitar, vocals
 Mick Morris – saxophone
 Phil Nelson – bass guitar
 Chris O'Connor – guitar, vocals
 David Pace – trumpet, vocals
 Paul Stewart – trumpet, vocals

Production
 Engineer – Chris Thompson
 Assistant engineer – Graham Duncan
 Mix engineer and post-production – Clive Martin
 Assistant mix engineer – Andrew Scott, Niven Garland, Stuart Day
 Producer – Lobby Loyde, except "Nude School" – Francois Taviaux aka Franswah

Charts

Note

References

1988 albums
Painters and Dockers albums
Mushroom Records albums